Roller Coaster is a platform game which contains some strategy and puzzle elements. It holds the claim of being the first video game to simulate amusement rides. Roller Coaster was released in 1985 by  British video game developer Elite Systems, to overwhelmingly positive reviews. It was, for a time, one of the most popular games for the ZX Spectrum. A version for the Commodore 64 was planned but never released.

Gameplay
The game takes place in and around an amusement park after closing-time. The player takes control of the park's owner, Colonel G. Bogey. A disgruntled employee has scattered the takings all over the fairground in the form of money bags. The goal is to collect the money.

In order to complete the game, the player must collect every money bag which is strewn around the city-sized amusement park; even the money bags placed on precarious perches and in the middle of rides. In order to do this, gambles and risks will have to be taken. The player can also be killed instantaneously by some dangers. This can be caused by numerous careless acts such as jumping from a great height, getting skewered by an erratic turnstile. The player has ten lives. Once the protagonist has died ten times, the player loses and the game is over.

Reception
A 1985 review in CRASH gave Roller Coaster a 94%.

Four years later, in a review of the budget re-release of Roller Coaster,  CRASH magazine wrote, "The emphasis in Roller Coaster is to have vast amounts of fun, and, boy, do you! Each screen is deviously devised, but not difficult to master once you get to grips with the gameplay. And the gameplay—it's so addictive! Don't hesitate to buy Roller Coaster!"

Legacy

Roller Coaster was reworked into the 1991 Game Boy title Dragon's Lair: The Legend, with the game's plot and graphics amended in order to closer resemble those of the original Dragon's Lair coin-op. As less of the playing area was visible in the Game Boy port than in the Spectrum version, the display was effectively a window on each of the original version's screens, scrolling within each one and flicking to the next when the edge of the screen was reached.

References

External links

1985 video games
Cancelled Amstrad CPC games
Cancelled Commodore 64 games
Platform games
Video games developed in the United Kingdom
Video games set in amusement parks
ZX Spectrum games
Roller coaster games and simulations